Shibing County (Hmu: Qib Jux) is a county in the east of Guizhou province, China. It is under the administration of the Qiandongnan Miao and Dong Autonomous Prefecture.

Shibing's history goes back to at least 1391, when it was an important crossing halfway on the road between Zhenyuan and Huangping. The name Shibing is based on Miao language words for the stop in the middle. Shibing was established as a county in 1444. Between 1958 and 1962 it was part of Huangping County.

The total population is 170,000 as of 2021, 58.53% of the population belongs to minorities, of these, 52.75% are Miao.

Shibing Karst landscape is part of the South China Karst World Natural Heritage Site.

Administrative divisions 
Shibing administers over:

 Chengguang town (城关镇)
 Yanliutang town (杨柳塘镇)
 Shuangjing town (双井镇)
 Niudachang town (牛大场镇)
 Mahao town (马号镇)
 Baiduo town (白垛乡)
 Ganxi town (甘溪乡)
 Maxi town (马溪乡)

Climate

References

External links
 

County-level divisions of Guizhou
Counties of Qiandongnan Prefecture